Metiolkine is an urban-type settlement in the Sievierodonetsk urban community, Sievierodonetsk Raion of Luhansk Oblast of eastern Ukraine. Population: 

During the Battle of Donbas (2022), Metiolkine was taken over by Russian and separatist forces.

Demographics
Native language distribution as of the Ukrainian Census of 2001:
 Ukrainian: 79.47%
 Russian: 19.43%

References

Urban-type settlements in Sievierodonetsk Raion